The 2001 South Australian Soccer Federation season was the 95th season of soccer in South Australia.

2001 SASF Premier League

The 2001 South Australian Premier League season was the top level domestic association football competition in South Australia for 2001. It was contested by 12 teams in a single 22 round league format, each team playing all of their opponents twice.

Finals

2001 SASF State League

The 2001 South Australian State League season was the second highest domestic level association football competition in South Australia. It was contested by 12 teams in a single 22 round league format, each team playing all of their opponents twice.

N.B. Two matches in the final round weren't played.

Finals

See also
2001 SASF Premier League
2001 SASF State League
National Premier Leagues South Australia
Football Federation South Australia

References

2001 in Australian soccer
Football South Australia seasons